The Florida sand darter ('Ammocrypta bifascia)  is a species of freshwater ray-finned fish, a darter from the subfamily Etheostomatinae, part of the family Percidae, which also contains the perches, ruffes and pikeperches. It is endemic to Gulf Coast drainages from the Aplalachicola to the Perdido River in Florida and southern Alabama. It inhabits streams with waters that are clear to tannin-stained where there are shifting sand bottoms and a moderate to fast flow. It is most frequently encountered where there is a moderate current in medium-sized to large streams, but it will enter smaller streams on occasion. Its appearance is identical to the naked sand darter aside from 2 black bands on each dorsal fin. This species forms a clade with the naked sand darter (A. beanii) the Western sand darter (A. clara'').

References

Ammocrypta
Fish of the Eastern United States
Freshwater fish of the Southeastern United States
Taxa named by James David Williams
Fish described in 1975